Class E6 on the Pennsylvania Railroad was the final type of 4-4-2 "Atlantic" locomotive built by the railroad, and second only to the Milwaukee Road's streamlined class A in size, speed and power.  Although quickly ceding top-flight trains to the larger K4s Pacifics, the E6 remained a popular locomotive on lesser services and some lasted to the end of steam on the PRR.  One, #460, called the Lindbergh Engine, is preserved at the Railroad Museum of Pennsylvania.
It was moved indoors to begin preparations for restoration on March 17, 2010. On January 10, 2011, PRR #460 was moved to the museum's restoration shop for a two- to three-year project, estimated to cost $350,000. The engine is listed in the National Register of Historic Places.

Design 
The E6 was designed by the Pennsy's General Superintendent of Motive Power, Lines East, Alfred W. Gibbs, and his team.  They produced an Atlantic of modern design, featuring a large and free-steaming boiler, outside Walschaert valve gear,  piston valves on the cylinders, and a cast steel KW pattern trailing truck designed by the PRR's Chief Mechanical Engineer, William F. Kiesel, Jr.  Modern features never present on the E6 design, and never retrofitted, included the mechanical stoker, power reverse and feedwater heater.

Prototypes and testing 

A single prototype E6 locomotive, #5075, was turned out by the PRR's Juniata Shops in 1910; as in the railroad's normal fashion, it would embark on a lengthy process of testing and experimentation before a production order was placed.

By 1910, the larger 4-6-2 "Pacific" type was the accepted express passenger locomotive, and it was somewhat contrarian for the PRR to be considering a new Atlantic class for that service. The E6, however, proved Gibbs et al. correct.

This was with the original cylinder bore.

Superheating was applied after these tests, and proved itself so well that all other locomotives in the class were built superheated as class E6s, including two further prototypes. On the PRR's static test plant at Altoona Works, the final version of the E6s produced  in its cylinders at 56 mph.

Also tested on prototype #1092 (classified E6sa), were rotary valves designed by O. W. Young, actuated by regular Walschaerts gear. These proved successful but insufficiently so to be chosen for production locomotives over the reliable piston valve.

The broad-boilered E-6 was the first locomotive to achieve over 1,000 hp per driving axle.

Production and service 
Following the successful testing of the prototype locomotives, the PRR ordered a production run of a further eighty locomotives which were delivered in 1914. All were fitted with superheaters. They were largely assigned to main line limiteds between Jersey City or Manhattan Transfer and either Washington, D.C. or Harrisburg, Pennsylvania, although they sometimes ran through to Altoona, Pennsylvania. Larger locomotives were generally used on the mountain grades past Altoona.

All locomotives were fitted with boxy oil-fired headlights from new, and the production locomotives had long tailrods projecting from the front of the cylinders.  The tailrods were soon removed, as they were on other PRR classes that had them, and the oil headlights were replaced by electric units and turbogenerators, the latter sited between the headlamp and the stack.

As K4s Pacifics became available in greater numbers in the 1920s, the E6s locomotives were displaced from top-flight trains, but continued in service in lesser assignments, and particularly along the New Jersey seashore routes. Nine locomotives were transferred to the rosters of the Pennsylvania-Reading Seashore Lines, and including those, all 83 of class E6s were still in service in 1947. Some locomotives were leased by the PRR to subsidiary Long Island Rail Road.

Lindbergh run

Celebrated pioneer aviator Charles Lindbergh returned to the United States on June 11, 1927, after his successful solo transatlantic flight from New York City to Paris; he was greeted by President Calvin Coolidge at Washington, DC and awarded the Distinguished Flying Cross.  There was intense competition between several newsreel companies to be the first to get footage of the ceremony back to New York to show in the Broadway theaters.  Several companies chartered aircraft, but the International News Reel Corporation instead chartered a special train from the Pennsylvania Railroad, repeating what it had done for President Coolidge's inauguration.

A plane could get from Washington to New York faster than a train, but the train could carry a darkroom to develop the film en route, making the train competitive.  PRR management seized the opportunity to make headlines and set everything up for a record run. Other trains would be moved out of the way of the Lindbergh newsreel special.

E6s Atlantic #460 was selected, being recently overhauled but having had time to "run in" after the work; B60B baggage car #7874 was equipped as a darkroom and P70 coach #3301 would carry PRR and newsreel company officials. The crew were cleared to run as fast as they considered safe; the tender would not need refueling during the run and the water scoop would pick up water from track pans without stopping. However, the scoop was damaged during the first pickup attempt due to the speed at which the train had been traveling. An unscheduled three-minute stop near Wilmington was needed to repair it and fill up from a standpipe.

The newsreels brought by train reached the cinema screens over an hour before the ones flown due to the delay to process the latter. The Pennsylvania Railroad used this victory extensively in publicity in the following years.

Due to its historical importance, the "Lindbergh Engine" #460, was selected for preservation as a static exhibit. #460 was added to the National Register of Historic Places in 1979 as Passenger Locomotive No. 460.  It was retired from service in 1955.

References 

Steam locomotives of the United States
4-4-2 locomotives
E6
Passenger locomotives
Railway locomotives introduced in 1910
Standard gauge locomotives of the United States